Rhinerrhiza divitiflora, commonly known as the raspy root orchid, is the only species in the genus Rhinerrhiza from the orchid family, Orchidaceae. It is an epiphytic or lithophytic orchid with usually only a single stem, many flat, raspy roots, between two and six leathery leaves and up to sixty pale orange flowers with red spots and blotches. The sepals and petals are narrow, thin and pointed. It mainly grows on rainforest trees and is found between the Atherton Tableland in Queensland and the Hunter River in New South Wales.

Description
The petals are slightly shorter than the sepals. The side lobes are erect and the middle lobe is short and blunt with a short spur. Flowering occurs from August to November but the flowers only last for one or two days.

Taxonomy and naming
The raspy root orchid was first formally described in 1873 by George Bentham after an unpublished description by Ferdinand von Mueller who gave it the name Saccolabium divitiflorus and published the description in Flora Australiensis from a specimen collected by Robert D. FitzGerald near the Macleay River. In 1954, Herman Rupp changed the name to Rhinerrhiza divitiflora. The name Rhinerrhiza is derived from the Ancient Greek words rhine meaning "file", "rasp" or "shark" and rhiza meaning "root". The specific epithet is derived from the Latin words dives meaning "rich" or "wealthy" and flos meaning "flower".

Distribution and habitat
Rhinerrhiza divitiflora grows on trees in rainforest and other humid forests and sometimes on rocks. It is found between the Atherton Tableland in Queensland and the Hunter River in New South Wales.

See also
 List of Orchidaceae genera

References

Endemic orchids of Australia
Orchids of New South Wales
Orchids of Queensland
Monotypic Epidendroideae genera
Vandeae genera
Aeridinae
Plants described in 1873